St. Michan's Church  is a Church of Ireland church located in Church Street, Dublin, Ireland. The first Christian chapel on this site dated from 1095, and operated as a Catholic church until the Reformation. The current church dates from 1686, and has served Church of Ireland parishioners in Dublin for more than 300 years. The church is known for its vaults, which contain a number of 'mummified' remains.

Building
Built on the site of an early Norse chapel from 1095, the current structure dates largely from a reconstruction undertaken under William Robinson in 1686, but is still the only parish church on the north side of the Liffey surviving from a Viking foundation.

While the exterior of the church may be unimpressive, the interior boasts some fine woodwork, and an organ (dated 1724) on which Handel is said to have composed his Messiah.

Vaults

Interments
The vaults of St. Michan's uniquely contain many mummified remains. The walls in the vaults contain limestone, which has kept the air dry, creating ideal conditions for preservation. Among the preserved remains are the 400-year-old body of a nun, a six-and-a-half-foot man popularly believed to have been a crusader, a body with its feet and right hand severed, and the Sheares brothers—Henry and John—who took part in the 1798 rebellion. The various holders of the title Earl of Leitrim were also interred here.

Damage
A number of crypts in the St. Michan's vaults were damaged by vandals in 1996 and again in early 2019. Following the 2019 incident, Archdeacon David Pierpoint told the media that several mummified remains were desecrated by vandals, including the remains of a 400-year-old nun, and the decapitation of the 800-year-old 'crusader'.

Access
The church vaults are open to tours on Saturdays, and seasonally on some weekdays, receiving approximately 27,000 visitors during 2018. Following the vandalism event in early 2019, these tours were temporarily cancelled, recommencing by early July 2019.

Organ
The organ, built circa 1940 by Evans and Barr of Belfast, is housed within the eighteenth-century organ case constructed by John Baptiste Cuvillie between 1723–1725. The three manual pneumatic console employs modern compass and playing dimensions yet has been squeezed into the space originally occupied by much narrower keyboards. The Swell division features a slider soundboard, with separate pneumatic underaction; the Great and Choir divisions are served by sliderless ventil chests. Stopaction is pneumatic throughout.

In front of the gallery is the Organ Trophy, a carved wooden piece which depicts 17 musical instruments and was installed in 1724. It is widely considered that George Frideric Handel practised in advance of the first performance of Messiah on this organ.

Gallery

References

Church of Ireland churches in Dublin (city)